Hilda Elisa Ramos Manes (born 1 September 1964 in Matanzas) is a retired Cuban discus thrower.

Her personal best throw is 70.88 metres, achieved in May 1992 in Havana. This is the current North American, Central American and Caribbean (NACAC) record.

International competitions

References 

1964 births
Sportspeople from Matanzas
Athletes (track and field) at the 1991 Pan American Games
Athletes (track and field) at the 1992 Summer Olympics
Cuban female discus throwers
Living people
Olympic athletes of Cuba
Athletes (track and field) at the 1987 Pan American Games
Pan American Games medalists in athletics (track and field)
Pan American Games silver medalists for Cuba
Central American and Caribbean Games gold medalists for Cuba
Competitors at the 1986 Central American and Caribbean Games
Competitors at the 1998 Central American and Caribbean Games
Central American and Caribbean Games medalists in athletics
Competitors at the 1990 Goodwill Games
Medalists at the 1987 Pan American Games
Medalists at the 1991 Pan American Games
20th-century Cuban women